Daniel Allen Wilson (born March 25, 1969), is an American former professional baseball player. He played in Major League Baseball as a catcher from  through , most notably as a member of the Seattle Mariners where he played 12 of his 14 seasons. The 1996 All-Star selection began his career with the Cincinnati Reds before being traded to the Mariners where, he was regarded as one of the best defensive catchers in major-league history. At the time of his retirement in 2005, Wilson held the American League record for career fielding percentage by a catcher. In 2012, Wilson was inducted into the Seattle Mariners Hall of Fame alongside his battery-mate, Randy Johnson.

Baseball career

Amateur
Wilson excelled as a baseball player from a very early age. He led his hometown Barrington, Illinois team to a 3rd-place finish in the 1981 Little League World Series. At Barrington High School he starred as a pitcher and catcher. He was selected out of high school in the 26th round of the 1987 Major League Baseball Draft by the New York Mets, but did not sign, electing instead to play college baseball at the University of Minnesota. In 1988, he played collegiate summer baseball with the Cotuit Kettleers of the Cape Cod Baseball League.

Minor leagues (1990–1993)
He re-entered the draft in 1990; he was selected in the first round, seventh overall, by the Cincinnati Reds. He signed in time to play 32 games with the Charleston Wheelers of the South Atlantic League. He returned to Charleston at the start of the 1991 season, batting .315 in 52 games before earning a promotion to Class AA Chattanooga. He started the 1992 season with Nashville in the Triple-A American Association, and he batted .251 in 106 games there before earning a September callup to the major leagues at age 23. He returned to the minor leagues the following year, going to the Indianapolis Indians since the Reds had changed their AAA affiliation after the 1992 season, and he played 51 games for the Indians as well as 36 games in the majors for the Reds.

Seattle Mariners (1994–2005)
After the 1993 season, the Reds traded Wilson to the Seattle Mariners for second baseman Bret Boone. He made the Mariners' roster out of spring training and became an established major-league player, replacing Dave Valle as the Mariners catcher. In his first full season in the majors, he struggled at the plate, batting .216, but he showed signs of his defensive ability with a .986 fielding percentage. That turned out to be the lowest fielding percentage he would have in the years he spent as the Mariners' primary catcher. The 1995 season went better for him; he played 119 games, batting .278 and raising his fielding percentage to .995, as the Mariners won the American League Western Division pennant.

In 1996, Wilson set career highs with 146 games played, 18 home runs, 83 runs batted in, and a .774 OPS. In addition, he made his only All-Star appearance. Wilson hit three home runs in an April 11, 1996 game in Detroit. The 1996 season was also his first working with starting pitcher Jamie Moyer.

Wilson was the battery-mate for Mariners pitcher Randy Johnson on June 24, 1997 when Johnson struck out 19 batters in a game against the Oakland Athletics, just one strike out less than the major league single-game strikeout record of 20 strike outs in a 9 inning game. Approximately six weeks later on August 8, 1997, the battery-mates teamed up to strike out another 19 batters in a game against the Chicago White Sox.

In 1998 Wilson hit an inside-the-park-grand slam, an unusual feat for any ballplayer, and especially for a catcher. Wilson remained a dependable battery mate for Mariners pitchers over the next several seasons. In the 2000 season, Wilson's numbers declined to a .235 batting average and .990 fielding percentage; he was also limited to 90 games because of injuries. However, in 2001, he regained his form, playing 123 games (122 at catcher) and posting a .265 batting average and a .999 fielding percentage (one error in 744 total chances). Although it was becoming late in his career, he posted a .295 batting average in 115 games for the Mariners in 2002, and a .998 fielding percentage over 96 games in 2003. In what ended up being his last full healthy season in the majors, he batted .251 with 33 RBI in 2004.

Wilson lost his starting job at the beginning of the 2005 season to Miguel Olivo. On May 4, he suffered a torn ACL in his right knee during a game against the Los Angeles Angels of Anaheim. Wilson had intended the 2005 season to be his last as a player, and he announced his retirement, effective at the end of the 2005 season, on September 12. Although a torn ACL commonly keeps athletes sidelined for most of a season, Wilson spent most of the rest of the season rehabilitating his knee and was activated from the disabled list on September 30. He came back for one final inning on September 30 against the Oakland Athletics; he had not recovered enough to swing a bat, but he was able to crouch and throw. The Mariners' starting pitcher in that game was Jamie Moyer, with whom Wilson had formed a battery for 190 previous starts dating back to 1996. Moyer pitched to five batters in the inning, which ended when Bobby Kielty flied out to center field, and the Athletics scored no runs. Moyer went on to pitch seven more innings, and the Mariners defeated the Athletics, 4–1.

Career statistics
In a 14-year major league career, Wilson played in 1,299 games, accumulating 1,097 hits in 4,186 at bats for a .262 career batting average along with 88 home runs and 519 runs batted in. He ended his career with a .995 fielding percentage; the highest for a catcher in American League history, and the sixth highest in major league history. Wilson led American League catchers twice in fielding percentage, twice in putouts, twice in baserunners caught stealing and twice in range factor.

Wilson set an American League record for catchers with 1,051 putouts in 1997, the fourth highest season total for a catcher in major league history. His 1,128 total chances in 1997 were the sixth highest season total for a catcher in major league history. In 2001, Wilson committed only one error in 122 games, for a .9987 fielding percentage, the fourth highest season average in major league history. He played in more games as a catcher than any other player in Mariners history (1,281). He holds the Mariners career records for home runs by a catcher (including two inside-the-park home runs), and the team's single season record for catchers in RBI with 83 in 1996.

Later life
On January 17, 2012, Wilson was named to the Mariners Hall of Fame.

Since 2011, he has appeared as one of the color commentators for Seattle Mariners baseball games on Root Sports. Notably, along with Dave Sims, Wilson called the game on August 15, 2012 when Félix Hernández pitched the first perfect game in Mariners' franchise history. He was also broadcasting on Root Sports on June 8, 2012 when six Mariners' pitchers combined for a no-hitter.

On November 3, 2013, the Mariners announced that Wilson will become the team's Minor League Catching Coordinator.

References

External links

 "Another M's icon hangs it up - from the Seattle Post-Intelligencer
 "Brothers in Arms" - Interview along with Jamie Moyer for Focus on the Family's Breakaway magazine
Dan Wilson Profile, Baseball Digest, August 1996

Major League Baseball catchers
Cincinnati Reds players
Seattle Mariners players
American League All-Stars
Seattle Mariners announcers
Charleston Wheelers players
Chattanooga Lookouts players
Nashville Sounds players
Indianapolis Indians players
Everett AquaSox players
Tacoma Rainiers players
San Antonio Missions players
Minnesota Golden Gophers baseball players
Cotuit Kettleers players
Baseball players from Illinois
People from Barrington, Illinois
1969 births
Living people
All-American college baseball players